Yolkino is an urban locality (an urban-type settlement) in Sverdlovsk Oblast, Russia. Population:

References

Urban-type settlements in Sverdlovsk Oblast